The 2022–23 AS Trenčín season is the club's 23st season in the Slovak Super Liga and 12th consecutive. AS Trenčín participated in the Fortuna Liga and Slovak Cup.

Players 
As of 14 January 2023

Transfers

Transfers in

Loans in

Transfers out

Loans out

Friendlies

Pre-season

Competition overview

Fortuna Liga

Regular stage

League table

Results summary

Results by round

Matches

Slovak Cup

Statistics

Goalscorers

References

External links 
 Official website
 Futbalnet

AS Trenčín seasons
AS Trenčín season